Vampire: The Masquerade – Bloodlines 2 is an upcoming action role-playing video game published by Paradox Interactive. A sequel to Vampire: The Masquerade – Bloodlines (2004), the game is part of the World of Darkness series and based on the tabletop role-playing game Vampire: The Masquerade. It was originally developed by Hardsuit Labs, but the publisher announced in February 2021 that production had been moved to another, as of yet unnamed, developer.

The game follows a human in 21st-century Seattle, who is killed and revived as a "thinblood" vampire with relatively weak vampiric abilities. It is mainly played in a first-person perspective, alternating to third-person for contextual activities. The player assigns their character one of three disciplinesunique and upgradable powersbefore joining one of several vampire clans. It is planned to be released for Microsoft Windows, PlayStation 4, PlayStation 5, Xbox One, and Xbox Series X/S.

Gameplay
Vampire: The Masquerade – Bloodlines 2 is presented mainly from the first-person perspective, alternating to third-person for contextual activities such as specific attacks. Before the game begins, players create a vampire character, and can select a character background that informs who they were as a human, such as a barista (the default background, with no bonuses), career criminal, coroner, or a police officer, with each offering different dialog and interaction options with the game world. The player character's pronouns are chosen independently from their selected body type.

After starting the game, the thinblood must choose from one of three upgradable disciplines (vampiric abilities): Chiropteran (gliding and summoning bats), Mentalism (levitating objects and people), and Nebulation (summoning mist to attack, conceal oneself, or transforming into mist to move through small spaces). The thinblood can eventually join one of five vampire clans, after which they have access to its specific disciplines and upgrades in addition to their original disciplines. Although some disciplines overlap clans, no two clans share the same combination. Clan Brujah can enhance their physical strength for high damage (Potence), and their speed (Celerity); Tremere can use blood magic combatively (Thaumaturgy) or enhance their senses (Auspex); Toreador also possesses Celerity, and can command the adoration and devotion of others (Presence); Ventrue can deflect or absorb attacks (Fortitude), and control the will of others (Dominate); and Malkavian also uses Auspex, and can debilitate their victims' minds (Dementation). Further clans are planned for inclusion post-release.

The player can engage in side missions away from the main story, some of which can be discovered through exploration. The player possesses a mobile phone and can text non-player characters to obtain information leading to other missions. Enemies and opposing forces can be dealt with violently, avoided through stealth or even seduced with sufficient abilities. Additionally, there are five factions with whom the player can ally themselves. Factions are shaped by ideologies instead of abilities and determine who is friend and foe to the player. They can join multiple factions simultaneously, remaining loyal or working against them from within, and some factions will refuse to work with the player depending on their actions.

As a vampire, the player character needs blood to survive, and can feed on humans, taking some or all of their blood; it can also be obtained from rats and blood bags. Heightened vampiric senses can be used to sense resonances in the blood of human victims, indicating their current emotional state, such as fear, desire, pain, anger, or joy. Feeding on specific resonances grants temporary enhancements to the player, for example increasing their melee strength or seduction ability. Repeatedly feeding on a particular resonance can grant permanent enhancements called merits. Vampires possess an inherent ability called Soak that provides resistance against ranged attacks; they also can absorb some damage before their health starts to deteriorate. Their supernatural physical abilities allow them to inflict greater damage on humans.

Players are penalized for using certain vampiric abilities in front of witnesses; exposing their existence as a vampire eventually alerts the police. Repeatedly violating the masquerade results in human civilians choosing to avoid the streets entirely, and the player being hunted by other vampires. The player character has points representing their humanity. Some actions cost humanity points such as killing innocents. A lower humanity score brings the player character closer to becoming a mindless beast.

Synopsis

Setting
Vampire: The Masquerade – Bloodlines 2 takes place in 21st-century Seattle, during the Christmas season. Set in the World of Darkness, the game depicts a world in which vampires, werewolves, demons, and other creatures shape human history. The vampires are bound by a code to maintain their secrecy (forbidding the use of vampiric abilities in front of humans) and avoid unnecessary killing (to preserve the vampire's last shreds of humanity). The vampires are divided into various clans with distinctive traits and abilities. The Toreadors are the closest to humanity, with a passion for culture; the Ventrue are noble, powerful leaders; the Brujah are idealists who excel at fighting; the Malkavians are cursed with insanity, or blessed with insight; the Gangrel are loners, in sync with their animalistic nature; the secretive, untrustworthy Tremere wield blood magic; and Nosferatu, who are condemned to a life in the shadows due to their monstrous appearance. The clans are loosely governed by the Camarilla, a cabal that enforces the vampire code and maintains the peace. Opposed to the Camarilla are the Sabbat, vampires who revel in their feral instincts and see all humans as prey, and the Anarchs, an idealistic group who disagree with the Camarilla's oligarchic political structure and believe that power should be shared by all vampires.

Alongside clans, Seattle is broken up by five vampire factions, each bound by their own ideologies. Led by the longest-reigning vampire prince Lou Grand, the Pioneer faction represents some of the oldest vampires of the city; their power has diminished as the other factions have grown. The Camarilla faction, led by Prince Alec Cross, has been in power for two decades. It represents the socially elite and wealthy vampires, wielding power in businesses throughout Seattle. The rarely seen Baron represents the criminal underworld, offering less-than-honest work to vampires, thinbloods, ghouls, and humans. The Tremere-founded Newcomers faction, led by Viktor Goga, is made up of blood mages, scholars, and runaways, and the Unseen faction is exclusive to the Nosferatu, who use hackers, journalists, and outcasts to gather intel.

The main character of Bloodlines 2, whom the player controls, is a fledgling thinblood vampire, transformed at the start of the game during a mass attack unto humans by rogue vampires. The thinbloods are a modern, weaker strain of vampires who are typically shunned and treated as lesser than Full-blood vampires. Unlike Full-bloods, thinbloods can consume human food in limited amounts, and are more resistant to sunlight. As Seattle has only relatively recently fallen under control of the Camarilla, vampires there are more tolerant of thinbloods.

Plot
The player character is one of a number of humans turned into vampires during a mass Embrace, an incident in which rogue vampires publicly attacked humans, breaking the Masquerade and causing discord between the city's vampire groups.

Development

Background
The 2004 release of Vampire: The Masquerade – Bloodlines had been a relative failure, selling fewer than 100,000 copies when it was launched in competition against sequels in Half-Life 2, Halo 2, and Metal Gear Solid 3: Snake Eater. Bloodlines was the last in a line of games developed by Troika Games that was critically well received but marred by technical issues and low sales, and Troika was shuttered shortly after its release, preventing them from developing a sequel. In 2004, then-director Leonard Boyarsky said that although the team would like to pursue a Bloodlines sequel, the decision belonged to then-publisher Activision. Before their closure, Troika had begun development of a workable prototype based on another of White Wolf's tabletop role-playing games, Werewolf: The Apocalypse, set in the same universe as Vampire: The Masquerade. In the years following Bloodlines release, the game became considered a cult classic, receiving over a decade of development by fans to fix technical issues and restore cut or incomplete content.

Video game publisher Paradox Interactive purchased White Wolf in October 2015, obtaining the World of Darkness intellectual property, including Bloodlines. Following the purchase, Paradox CEO Fredrik Wester confirmed that a sequel was possible, stating "when the time is right I guess a sequel will find its place in the market."

Production

Shortly after Paradox Interactive's acquisition of White Wolf, Seattle-based developer Hardsuit Labs' creative director Ka'ai Cluney convinced co-founder Andy Kipling to pitch a Bloodlines sequel to Paradox, while Cluney made contact with Bloodlines writer Brian Mitsoda. A meeting was arranged soon after, and Mitsoda joined the sequel as narrative lead, bringing in Cara Ellison as senior writer. Bloodlines composer Rik Schaffer also returned for the sequel as the main composer. Producer Christian Schlütter said: "When we as Paradox acquired the IP, we saw Bloodlines as the crown jewel... then [Hardsuit Labs] come along and have the perfect pitch, with the original writer on-board too. It all happened far faster than we expected." The project's internal code name was "Project Frasier", a reference to the Seattle-based sitcom Frasier.

Coinciding with the game's second publicly announced delay in July 2020, Mitsoda and Cluney were both terminated from their positions, as a joint decision by the leaderships at Hardsuit Labs and Paradox Interactive; no explanation was given. Mitsoda described the situation as unexpected and disappointing, after working on the game for five years. Following this, Alexandre Mandryka took over the role of creative director. In October 2020, Paradox confirmed that Ellison had also left the project. Game designer Chris Avellone served as a writer for the game for some time; following allegations of sexual assault in June 2020, Paradox Interactive confirmed that his contributions to the game would be removed.

In February 2021, Paradox Interactive announced that Hardsuit Labs no longer was working on the game, and that Paradox Interactive was collaborating with another developer to finish the production. Hardsuit Labs made their narrative team staff redundant shortly afterward. Paradox Interactive had prior to this considered cancelling the project, but decided to continue development with a new partner and to retain much of what had been produced for it until that point.

Writing
Ellison described the story and in-game factions as influenced by the conflicts over Seattle's modern identity, between its traditional music and culture and the modern developments brought by large corporations. Mitsoda said "There's this idea of how much Seattle can change before it's no longer Seattle. So we made the factions aspects of the old and the new." Ellison said that they wanted to move away from what she considered to be the "male power fantasy" of Bloodlines to give it a broader appeal. They also wanted to use the mass embrace to explore the transition from human to vampire and how people from different backgrounds react to their transformation, such as still having family members they have to leave behind.

The game provides the opportunity for the player to make decisions on how their character is played, but Schlütter described these options as "your preferred flavor of evilness," saying that the player is not a hero as vampires are parasites that feed on humanity. Mitsoda noted that they had to modernize the tone for contemporary audiences, but that it would still reflect the original's combination of noir, personal drama, political intrigue, and humor.

The Malkavians, a popular clan from the previous game, return in Bloodlines 2. The clan is cursed with insanity which grants them knowledge of future or unseen events and secrets though not necessarily with the context to understand such knowledge, allowing their dialog to reference events in the previous game before they happened. Like in the previous game, Malkavian dialog was written late in production, as Mitsoda said that the script needs to be complete before it can be rewritten for the Malkavian perspective. Due to their popularity, the Malkavians were always planned to be present in Bloodlines 2, but their mental ailments are represented with less comical effect to reflect changes to real-world societal perspectives on the subject. Mitsoda said that they aimed to show the "darker aspect" of sharing a network of insight and paranoia. Research was done in medical papers and real world sufferers of mental ailments to more fairly represent mental illness.

Game design
Translating the tabletop game to a video game was described as a delicate balance. The developers used the "Investigation" skill in the first Bloodlines as an example, an ability which highlights certain objects in the environment, but that rarely had the opportunity for use and meant that players with and without the skill had a similar experience. The developers' goal was to make the individual skills and abilities matter more in Bloodlines 2 so they did not feel like wasted choices.

While the player character is partially resistant to sunlight, the developers opted to have the game take place exclusively at night. They experimented with implementing a day and night cycle with sunlight serving as an obstacle, but found it difficult to make the experience fun. Mitsoda said that combat was a main focus that they wished to improve over the previous game, describing it as "not very good".

Similarly, in the tabletop game combat skills may affect the success of striking an opponent, but in Bloodlines 2, the developers wanted the attack to hit if you are aiming in the right direction. Instead, experience in a particular combat style such as melee or ranged gradually unlocks relevant passive abilities. The original Bloodlines offered various overlapping systems that allowed for stealth, melee and ranged combat, and a feeding system in both first- and third-person. In attempting to cover so many gameplay styles, the Troika team had struggled, contributing to the negative critical reception of those systems. Hardsuit Labs decided on a first-person experience to focus their resources. The developers wanted to avoid players using a common first-person RPG strategy where they could run and attack simultaneously. They were inspired by the 2012 video game Dishonored'''s fast-paced combat systems, offering attacks that moves the player character body in the direction of their attack. As the Vampire: The Masquerade tabletop game's fifth edition was in development alongside Bloodlines 2, some of Hardsuit Labs' ideas were adopted into the board game, including the concept of Resonances serving to provide enhancements.

ReleaseBloodlines 2 was first teased in February 2019 with the release of the dating app "Tender", created by Paradox and Alice & Smith. The app offered to use a "soulmate algorithm" and asks for the user's blood type before offering to match them with sick people nearby. A Twitch livestream, and later Paradox's own official Twitter account also displayed a memo from fictional Tender CEO Malcolm Chandler noting the need to be prepared for March 21, 2019 in San Francisco, the date the game was publicly revealed.

The game is planned for release for Microsoft Windows, PlayStation 4, PlayStation 5, Xbox One, and Xbox Series X/S. Three different pre-order versions have been made available: Standard, Unsanctioned, and Blood Moon, which will include two story-based downloadable content packs, and the werewolf-themed expansion "Season of the Wolf". Additionally, pre-orders of the Unsanctioned version or above include in-game items referencing Bloodlines characters such as Jeanette Voerman and Damsel. The Collector's Edition includes a steelbook case for the game, a map of Seattle, a 7-inch vinyl soundtrack, a digital edition of the Vampire: The Masquerade fifth edition core book, and a 28 cm statue of the character Elif. It also includes three DLC packs that include additional outfits, and "Season of the Wolf".

Initially scheduled for release in March 2020, the game was pushed back in late 2019 to an unspecified 2020 release date, and further delayed in late 2020 to an unspecified 2021 release date. Paradox CEO Ebba Ljungerud explained the delay as caused by the staff changes, the 2020 COVID-19 pandemic, and a delay in receiving development kits for the PlayStation 5 and Xbox Series X/S consoles. Along with the announcement of the change in developers in February 2021, the game was delayed past 2021; in November 2021, Paradox Interactive said that they were happy with the progress, but that they needed more time before revealing a new release date. In July 2022, Paradox Interactive CEO Fredrik Wester said on Twitter that "Bloodlines is still in development and we will let you know more when we are ready." In November 2022, Fredrik Wester said that a 2023 release window for Bloodlines 2'' was "absolutely not impossible", and that a launch date would be announced soon.

References

Notes

References

External links
 

Action role-playing video games
Dark fantasy role-playing video games
Dark fantasy video games
Gothic video games
Paradox Interactive games
PlayStation 4 games
PlayStation 5 games
Single-player video games
Unreal Engine games
Upcoming video games
Vampire: The Masquerade video games
Video games developed in the United States
Video games featuring protagonists of selectable gender
Video games postponed due to the COVID-19 pandemic
Video game sequels
Video games set in Seattle
Windows games
Xbox One games
Xbox Series X and Series S games